Sexmix (subtitled Archive Tapes And Studio Adventures, Volume One) is a Frankie Goes to Hollywood remix album released on 3 August 2012. The set focuses on rare FGTH single formats, specifically the cassette releases ("singlettes") and CD releases.

Controversy
A day before the set was revealed, it was revealed that mono mixes had been supplied for the "All In The Body, All In The Mind" singlette, with hints of a lossless replacement download for said single. Many people didn't take notice until the set was released, when a majority of people gave the release low ratings due to this.

Eventfully, on 21 November 2012 ZTT offered a mail-order physical replacement disc (with said tracks mastered in stereo) to those who had purchased the set prior, by either sending them the mono disc or emailing (or sending) a scanned copy of their receipt or other proof of purchase (to prove they brought Sexmix) to Union Square Music's email address.

Track listing

Disc 1
"all in the body" - 1:23
 "The Soundtrack from Bernard Rose's Video of the Welcome to the Pleasuredome Single" - 5:43
 "Get It On" - 4:11
 "Welcome to the Pleasuredome (How To Remake The World)" - 11:40
 "all in the mind" - 1:13
 "Relax (International)" - 4:44
 "The Power of Love (Extended, singlette version)" - 9:20
 "scrapped" - 1:39
 "Holier Than Thou" - 1:08
 "trapped" - 2:29
 "Holier Than Thou" - 4:09
 "The Power of Love (Instrumental, singlette version)" - 3:32
 "The World is My Oyster (in its 7" form) - 4:18
 "don't lose what's left" - 0:19
 "Rage Hard ⊕⊕⊕✪" - 17:13

 Tracks 1-5 form the original "All In The Body, All In The Mind" singlette. Tracks 1 and 5 are excerpts from Walter Kaufmann's 1967 translation of Friedrich Nietzsche's The Birth of Tragedy as read by Geoffrey Palmer, track 2 is the soundtrack to the shorter "Escape Act" version of the original promo clip (the full "Alternative to Reality" version clocks in at 7:52), track 3 is the full version of their cover of T-Rex's "Get It On" (which had been featured in shorter edits on the vinyl release) and track 4 is a unique extended version of "Real Altered".
 Tracks 7-12 form the original cassette release of the first "Power of Love" 12". Differences include Track 7 opening with an excerpt of T.S. Eliot's Four Quartets, tracks 9 and 11 having the usage of "fuck" and "shit" reversed and track 12 ending with two short unlisted tracks, which are merged into that track.
 Tracks 6 and 13 are the original B-sides to the afromented singles. "Relax (International)" was the live B-side of the "Real Altered" 12" and "The World Is My Oyster (in its 7" form)" was the B-side to the "Power of Love" 7".
 Track 14 is an excerpt of "Don't Lose What's Left (Of Your Little Mind)" which predicted "Roadhouse Blues" on the rare "Rage Hard" CD single.
 Track 15 was originally released on the rare CD single release of "Rage Hard".

Disc 2
 "Relax (Sex Mix)" - 16:26
 "Later On (from One September Monday)" - 1:36
 "Ferry Cross The Mersey (...And Here I'll Stay) - 4:07
 "Two Tribes (Keep The Peace, intro)" - 0:24
 "One February Friday (Singlette version, part 1)" - 0:40
 "Two Tribes (Carnage)" - 7:55
 "One February Friday (Singlette version, part 2)" - 1:08
 "War (somewhere between Hiding and Hidden)" - 4:14
 "One February Friday (Singlette Version, part 3)" - 0:22
 "Two Tribes (Keep The Peace, outro)" - 0:06
 "Warriors of the Wasteland (Compacted)" - 23:39
 "The Diamond Mine" - 2:24
 "Warriors (Twelve Wild Disciples Mix)" - 9:44
 "Warriors (Of The Wasteland) (Instrumental, fewer vocals)" - 5:01
 "Warriors Of The Wasteland (7" Version)" - 3:55
 "Monopoly Re-Solution" - 2:25
 "Do You Think I'm Sexy?" - 4:20
 "Watching The Wildlife (Voiceless)" - 3:51

 Track 1 is the first 12" mix of "Relax", infamous for its length, the slightly offensive lines present through Holly's rambling and not including the regular song.
 Tracks 2, 5, 7 and 9 are interview excerpts that were only released on singlettes. Tracks 4 and 10 are spoken-dialogue tracks bridging the start and end "Two Tribes" singlette.
 Track 6 is the second 12" mix of "Two Tribes".
 Tracks 3 and 8 are the regular 12" cover B-sides to "Relax" and "Two Tribes" respectively.
 Track 11 was originally released as a single-track CD single in 1986. Track 11.3 is a mix of the album version without vocals except in the chorus at the end.
 Track 12 is a cover of Rod Stewart's "Do Ya Think I'm Sexy?", first released in 2009 on the now-discontinued digital version of Frankie Say Greatest. It was intended to be one of Warriors's planned B-sides, according to several sources.
 Track 13 was originally released as one of the B-sides to "Watching The Wildlife", except unlike previous releases it is not combined with bits 1 and 2.

References

2012 remix albums
Albums produced by Trevor Horn
Frankie Goes to Hollywood albums